Leon Panikvar (born 28 January 1983) is a Slovenian footballer who plays for SU Tillmitsch in Austria.

Career
On 14 July 2009, after a successful trial, Panikvar signed for the Hungarian outfit ZTE on a two-year contract with a one-year option. He made his league debut on 25 July 2009 in a 2–1 away win against Paksi SE.

In summer 2011, Panikvar left ZTE after the one-year option was not taken up. He was then invited for a trial with Kilmarnock where he signed a two-year contract on 17 August 2011.
Panikvar made his first appearance for Kilmarnock on 17 September 2011 in a 2–2 away draw to Aberdeen.

After failing to hold down a regular first-team place, he was released by Kilmarnock in January 2012.

References

1983 births
Living people
Sportspeople from Maribor
Association football midfielders
Slovenian footballers
Slovenia youth international footballers
NK Aluminij players
NK Maribor players
NK Bela Krajina players
NK Primorje players
Slovenian Second League players
Slovenian PrvaLiga players
Slovenian expatriate footballers
Expatriate footballers in Hungary
Slovenian expatriate sportspeople in Hungary
Zalaegerszegi TE players
Expatriate footballers in Scotland
Slovenian expatriate sportspeople in Scotland
Scottish Premier League players
Kilmarnock F.C. players
Pécsi MFC players
NK Drava Ptuj (2004) players
Expatriate footballers in Austria
Slovenian expatriate sportspeople in Austria